The World Senior Championship was a golf match held between the winners of the American PGA Seniors' Championship (now Senior PGA Championship) and the British PGA Seniors Championship. It was held from 1954 to 1978. It was a 36-hole match-play event held on a single day with the exception of the first year when it was held over two days. The British PGA Seniors Championship did not start until 1957. In 1954 and 1955 the British competitor was nominated by the British Association of Golf Writers while in 1956 four leading senior golfers played to decide the British entry.

The event was initially sponsored by Teacher's (whisky) and the players competed for the Teacher International Trophy.

From 1954 to 1968 the event was held England or Scotland. From 1969 to 1971 it was played at Bide-A-Wee Golf Course in Portsmouth, Virginia and from 1972 it alternated between Scotland and Bide-A-Wee.

Winners

References

Senior golf tournaments
Golf tournaments in the United Kingdom
Golf in Virginia
Recurring sporting events established in 1954
Recurring sporting events disestablished in 1978
1954 establishments in England